Guillermo Pérez de Arce Plummer (born 3 October 1906–10 June 1994) was a Chilean politician and entrepreneur who served as President of the Senate of Chile.

External links
 BCN Profile

1906 births
1994 deaths
Chilean people
Chilean politicians
Liberal Party (Chile, 1849) politicians
Presidents of the Senate of Chile
20th-century Chilean politicians